The 2012–13 season was PFC CSKA Sofia's 65th consecutive season in A Group. This article shows player statistics and all matches (official and friendly) that the club will play during the 2012–13 season.

Players

Squad stats 
Appearances for competitive matches only

|-
|colspan="14"|Players sold or loaned out after the start of the season:

|}
As of 25 May 2013

Players in/out

Summer transfers 

In:

Out:

Winter transfers 

In:

Out:

Pre-season and friendlies

Competitions

A Group

Table

Results summary

Results by round

Fixtures and results

Bulgarian Cup 

2–2 on aggregate. CSKA won on away goals and qualified for the Third Round.

CSKA won 7–0 on aggregate and qualified for the Quarterfinals.Lokomotiv Sofia won 1−0 on aggregate. CSKA is eliminated. Europa League 

By ending as runner-up from A Grupa 2011/12, CSKA Sofia qualified for the Europa League. They started in the second qualifying round.1–1 on aggregate. Mura 05 won on away goals. CSKA is eliminated.''

UEFA Club Rankings 
This is the current UEFA Club Rankings, including season 2011–12.

See also 
PFC CSKA Sofia

References

External links 
CSKA Official Site
CSKA Fan Page with up-to-date information
Bulgarian A Professional Football Group
UEFA Profile

PFC CSKA Sofia seasons
Cska Sofia